Archie Gottler (May 14, 1896 – June 24, 1959) was an American composer, screenwriter, actor, and film director. Gottler is known for being the director of Woman Haters (1934), the first of a series of 190 Three Stooges comedy short films for Columbia Pictures.

His works include:
Music for "Hunting the Hun", popular World War I song (1918)
"Heart of Wetona," World War I song of 1919

References

External links

 Archie Gottler recordings at the Discography of American Historical Recordings.

American film score composers
American male film score composers
American music arrangers
Musicians from New York City
1896 births
1959 deaths
Burials at Hollywood Forever Cemetery
20th-century American composers
Film directors from New York City
20th-century American male musicians